The Luxembourg Mathematical Society (SML, Société mathématique du Luxembourg) was founded in January 1989 on the initiative of Professor Jean-Paul Pier.

Its mission is the promotion of Pure and Applied Mathematics. The scope of action of the SML includes
the organization of conferences, workshops, seminars, round table discussions etc.
the edition of books, mathematical journals, newsletters etc.
the representation of Mathematics and the mathematics profession in Luxembourg inside and outside the Grand-Duchy of Luxembourg
 
The SML is a member of the European Mathematical Society (EMS). It has reciprocity agreements with the American Mathematical Society and the Royal Spanish Mathematical Society.

External links 
Homepage of the Luxembourg Mathematical Society

Mathematical societies
Organizations established in 1989